New Groove may refer to:

 New Groove (Bud Shank album), 1961
 New Groove (Groove Holmes album), 1974

See also
 The New Groove: The Blue Note Remix Project, a 1996 Blue Note Records remix compilation album